Glenea helleri is a species of beetle in the family Cerambycidae. It was described by Per Olof Christopher Aurivillius in 1923 and is known from the Philippines.

References

helleri
Beetles described in 1923